The 2012 División Profesional season (officially the 2012 Copa TIGO- Visión Banco for sponsorship reasons) was the 78th season of top-flight professional football in Paraguay.

Teams

Torneo Apertura
The Campeonato de Apertura, also the Copa TIGO-Visión Banco for sponsorship reasons, was the 106º official championship of the Primera División, called "Don Jesús Manuel Pallarés", and was the first championship of the 2012 season. It began on February 5 and ended on July 8.

Standings

Results

Torneo Clausura
The Campeonato de Clausura, also the Copa TIGO-Visión Banco for sponsorship reasons, was the 107º official championship of the Primera División, called "Centenario Club Cerro Porteñi, and was the second championship of the 2012 season. It began on July 28 and ended on December 16.

Standings

Results

Aggregate table
In 2012, Paraguay have seven slots in international cups (three in the Copa Libertadores de America and four in the Copa Sudamericana). These seven slots will be filled by five teams.
For the 2013 Copa Libertadores, the winner of the Apertura and Clausura tournaments qualify automatically. The third representative (going into the first round play-off) is the best placed non-champion from the cumulative table of both the Apertura and Clausura.
For the 2013 Copa Sudamericana, the champion of the Apertura and Clausura tournaments qualify automatically, with the 4th and 5th best placed teams from the Apertura and Clausura cumulatives.

Relegation
Relegations is determined at the end of the season by computing an average of the number of points earned per game over the past three seasons. The two teams with the lowest average is relegated to the División Intermedia for the following season.

See also
2012 in Paraguayan football

External links
APF's official website 
Season rules 
2012 season on RSSSF

Paraguay
1